Nina Qullu (Aymara nina fire, qullu mountain, "fire mountain", also spelled Nina Kkollu) is a mountain in the Andes of Bolivia which reaches a height of approximately . It is located in the Oruro Department, Nor Carangas Province (which is identical to the Huayllamarca Municipality).

References 

Mountains of Oruro Department